NGC 2500 is a barred spiral galaxy in the constellation Lynx which was discovered by William Herschel in 1788. Much like the local group in which our own Milky Way galaxy is situated, NGC 2500 is part of the NGC 2841 group of galaxies which also includes NGC 2541, NGC 2537 and NGC 2552. It has a H II nucleus and exhibits a weak inner ring structure.

References

External links

Barred spiral galaxies
2500
04165
22525
Lynx (constellation)